Lawrence W. Timmerman (1910–2003) was a member of the Wisconsin State Assembly.

Biography
Timmerman was born on June 1, 1910 in Milwaukee, Wisconsin. Timmerman received his bachelor's and master's degrees from Marquette University and his law degree from Marquette University Law School. His father was Lawrence J. Timmerman who also served in the Wisconsin Assembly. He practiced law.
Timmerman died January 8, 2003 in Wauwatosa, Wisconsin.

Political career
Timmerman was a member of the Assembly from 1955 to 1959. He then served on the Milwaukee County, Wisconsin Board of Supervisors from 1959 to 1980. He was a Republican.

References

Politicians from Milwaukee
Marquette University alumni
Marquette University Law School alumni
County supervisors in Wisconsin
Republican Party members of the Wisconsin State Assembly
Wisconsin lawyers
1910 births
2003 deaths
20th-century American politicians
Lawyers from Milwaukee
20th-century American lawyers